Sheridan Township is a township in Cowley County, Kansas, USA.  As of the 2000 census, its population was 159.

Geography
According to the USGS, it contains one cemetery, Silver Creek.

The streams of Plum Creek and Plum Creek run through this township.

References
 USGS Geographic Names Information System (GNIS)

External links
 City-Data.com

Townships in Cowley County, Kansas
Townships in Kansas